Ernst Deutsch, also known as Ernest Dorian (16 September 1890  – 22 March 1969), was a Jewish Austrian actor. In 1916, his performance as the protagonist in the world première of Walter Hasenclever's Expressionist play The Son in Dresden was praised. Deutsch also played the antihero Famulus in Paul Wegener's The Golem: How He Came into the World in 1920. He is known by English-speaking audiences for his role as Baron Kurtz in Carol Reed's 1949 film noir, The Third Man.

Family 

Deutsch was the son of Prague-based Jewish merchant Ludwig Kraus and his wife, Louise.  He married childhood friend Anuschka Fuchsova (daughter of Prague industrialist Arthur Fuchs) in 1922. Anuschka's cousin, Herbert Fuchs of Robettin, was the brother-in-law of author Franz Werfel.

Life and career 

Deutsch grew up in Prague, and attended high school. He was a skilled tennis player, ranking seventh on the Austro-Hungarian tennis list. After high school, Deutsch served in the army. He was a childhood friend of Franz Werfel.

In 1914, Deutsch made his stage debut for Berthold Viertel at the People's Theatre in Vienna. After a short season in Prague, Edgar Licho hired him for the Albert Theatre in Dresden, where he moved in 1916. In Dresden, Deutsch played Franz Moor in Schiller's The Robbers and Moritz Stiefel in Frank Wedekind's Spring Awakening. His performance in the title role of Hasenclever's The Son, which premiered on 8 October 1916, established him as an Expressionist actor; he also appeared in the play in 1918 and 1923. In 1917, Deutsch went to the Volksbühne in Berlin. He appeared until 1933 on a number of stages in the city, gave guest performances in Hamburg, Munich and Vienna, and participated in a tour of South America. Beginning in 1916, Deutsch appeared in 42 silent films. In April 1933, he left Germany due to Nazi antisemitism. Deutsch returned to Vienna and Prague, gave guest performances in Zurich, Brussels and (in 1936) London where he appeared in Charles Bennett's play Page From a Diary in the West End. In 1938 he emigrated to New York City and played briefly on Broadway in 1939 before moving to Hollywood, where he became an American citizen. Beginning 1942 he appeared as Ernest Dorian in Hollywood films, primarily as Nazis and German officers.

After a 1946 stay in Buenos Aires, Deutsch returned to Vienna via Paris the following year. In Vienna, he became a member of the Burgtheater. At the National Theatre Deutsch appeared in The Helpers of God, about Red Cross founder Henri Dunant, in 1948. Three years later he moved back to Berlin, appearing at the Schiller and Schlossparktheater. Deutsch also toured in Germany and abroad. Deutsch's film roles included Baron Kurtz in Carol Reed's film noir, The Third Man, starring Orson Welles and Joseph Cotten. He received the Volpi Cup as Best Actor at the 9th Venice International Film Festival in 1948 Venice Film Festival for his performance in Der Prozeß. Deutsch's performances in the title role of Gotthold Ephraim Lessing's Nathan the Wise and as Shylock in Shakespeare's The Merchant of Venice were critically praised. He played Nathan for more than 2,000 performances, and traveled with productions throughout Europe.

Deutsch died on 22 March 1969 in Berlin, and is buried in the Jewish cemetery on the Berlin highway. For the fourth anniversary of his death in 1973, Friedrich Schütter's former Junges Theater in the Uhlenhorst quarter of Hamburg was renamed after Deutsch (who had staged a performance of Nathan The Wise there shortly before his death).

Filmography 

 Die Rache der Toten (1916) – Schreiber, Ferenc
 Die zweite Frau (1917) – Jesuit
 Apokalypse (1918)
 Pique Dame (1918) – Graf St-. Germain
 Irrungen (1919) – Franz, Arbeiter
 The Geisha and the Samurai (1919)
 Die Frau im Käfig (1919)
 Blonde Poison (1919) – Rolf Röm (Enkel)
 The Galley Slave (2 parts) (1919) – Galeerensträfling
 Fluch der Vergangenheit (1919)
 Vom Schicksal erdrosselt (1919) – Ernst Dutton
 Die Tochter des Henkers (1919)
 The Monastery of Sendomir (1919)
 Aladdin und die Wunderlampe (1919)
 Hate (1920)
 From Morn to Midnight (1920) – Kassierer
 Monika Vogelsang (1920) – Johannes Walterspiel
 Gerechtigkeit (1920)
 Blackmailed (1920)
 The Hunt for Death (1920)
 The Golem: How He Came into the World (1920) – Der Rabbi Famulus
 Judith Trachtenberg (1920) – Judith's Brother
 Fiebernächte (1920)
 Ferreol (1920)
 Der gelbe Tod (2 parts) (1920)
 The Women House of Brescia (1920)
 Hannerl and Her Lovers (1921) – Priester
 Burning Country (1921) – Vikar Benedikt
 Lady Godiva (1921)
 Die Dame und der Landstreicher (1922)
 Duke Ferrante's End (1922) – Orlando
 Sein ist das Gericht (1922)
 Liebe kann man nicht kaufen (1922)
 Der Kampf ums Ich (1922)
 Der alte Gospodar (1922) – Zdenko & Wolfgan
 The Pagoda (1923)
 The Burning Secret (1923)
 The Ancient Law (1923) – Baruch, sein Sohn
 Debit and Credit (1924) – Bernhard
 Dagfin (1926) – Assairan, ein Armenier
 The Bordello in Rio (1927) – Plüsch (Popescu)
 Two Under the Stars (1927) – Pierre Marescot, Eintänzer
 Artists (1928) – Der Illusionist Maranoff
 The Prisoner of Corbal (1936) – The Fugitive
 Nurse Edith Cavell (1939) – Dr. Schroeder, Public Prosecutor
 The Man I Married (1940) – Otto
 Escape (1940) – Baron von Reiber (uncredited)
 So Ends Our Night (1941) – Dr. Behr
 Prisoner of Japan (1942) – Matsuru 
 Enemy Agents Meet Ellery Queen (1942) – Dr. Morse, Lido Club Physician
 Reunion in France (1942) – Captain 
 The Moon Is Down (1943) – Maj. Hunter
 Night Plane from Chungking (1943) – Major Brissac
 Isle of the Dead (1945) – Dr. Drossos 
 The Trial (1948) – Scharf, Tempeldiener
 The Third Man (1949) – 'Baron' Kurtz
  (1951) – Abel de Yonkh
 When the Heath Dreams at Night (1952)
 Nathan der Weise (1955, TV film) – Nathan
 Jedermann (1958, TV film)
 Sebastian Kneipp (1958) – Pope Leo XIII
 Ein Mädchen vom Lande (1961, TV film) – Frank Elgin
 Vor Sonnenuntergang (1962, TV film) – Matthias Clausen
 In der Strafkolonie (1963, TV film) – Der Reisende
 Der Fall Bohr (1966, TV film) – Peter von Bohr (final film role)

References

Bibliography 

 .

External links 

 
 Photographs of Ernst Deutsch
 

1890 births
1969 deaths
German male stage actors
German male film actors
German male silent film actors
German male television actors
German people of Jewish descent
Jewish German male actors
Volpi Cup for Best Actor winners
20th-century German male actors
Knights Commander of the Order of Merit of the Federal Republic of Germany
German expatriate male actors in the United States